Tortorella is a town and comune of the province of Salerno, Campania, in south-western Italy.

Geography
Located in southern Cilento, 11 km far from the Cilentan Coast, Tortorella is a hill town located in the middle of a large forest area part of Cilento and Vallo di Diano National Park.

The bordering municipalities are Casaletto Spartano, Morigerati, Santa Marina, Sapri, Torraca, Vibonati and Rivello, this one in Basilicata region. The only hamlet (frazione) is the village of Caselle.

See also
Cilentan dialect

References

External links

Official website

Localities of Cilento